Craig Andrew Philipson (born 18 November 1982 in Herston, Queensland) is an Australian cricketer who plays for the Queensland Bulls in Australian domestic cricket. He is an attacking right-handed batsman.

Philipson scored 110 on his first class debut, against Tasmania. In 2004–05 he had his best season to date with 447 Pura Cup runs at 37.25. He is a former Australia Under-19 player and was part of the side that won the 2002 World Cup.

External links
Player profile from cricinfo

1982 births
Living people
Australian cricketers
Queensland cricketers
Sydney Thunder cricketers
Cricketers from Brisbane
People educated at Brisbane Boys' College